The Miranda River (Portuguese, Rio Miranda, variant name Rio Mondego) is a river of Mato Grosso do Sul state in southwestern Brazil. It is a tributary of the Paraguay River. The river flows north and south, and forms the border between Brazil and Paraguay.

See also
List of rivers of Mato Grosso do Sul

References

 Brazilian Ministry of Transport
 Rand McNally, The New International Atlas, 1993.

Rivers of Mato Grosso do Sul
Tributaries of the Paraguay River